Rhantus papuanus was a species of beetle in family Dytiscidae. It was endemic to Papua New Guinea.

References

papuanus
Beetles described in 1939
Taxonomy articles created by Polbot